Janusz Bugajski (born 23 September 1954, in Nantwich, Cheshire, England) is a senior fellow at the Jamestown Foundation in Washington, D.C., and host of “Bugajski Hour” television shows broadcast in the Balkans. He was formerly a senior fellow at the Center for European Policy Analysis (CEPA) in Washington, D.C., and the director of New European Democracy Program at the Center for Strategic and International Studies (CSIS).

Bugajski has served as a consultant on East European affairs for various U.S. organizations and government agencies as for the U.S. Agency for International Development (USAID), the United States Department of Defense, the International Republican Institute (IRI), the Free Trade Union Institute (AFL-CIO), the International Research and Exchanges Board (IREX), and BBC television in London.

He testifies regularly before the U.S. Congress. He chairs the South-Central Europe area studies program at the Foreign Service Institute of the U.S. Department of State.

Life and career 
He came to the US in 1986. He is son of Piotr, a teacher, and Jadwiga (Kawska) Bugajski. He is an American of Polish descent.

1977 he obtained B.A. Honours from the University of Kent at Canterbury, UK, and in 1981 an M.Ph. in social anthropology from the London School of Economics and Political Science. He speaks English and Polish.

In 1981–1983 he has been consultant on Polish affairs for BBC Television, London; 1984–1985 he became Senior Research Analyst at Radio Free Europe (RFE/RL) in Munich, Germany. In 1986 he joined the Center for Strategic and International Studies (CSIS) in Washington, D.C., and established the center's East European department. He became associate director 1986–93 and director in 1993 for East European Studies at Center for Strategic and International Studies, Washington (DC).

He was also an adjunct lecturer American University (1991); lecturer of the Smithsonian Institution, the Foreign Service Institute, the Woodrow Wilson Center; consultant of the International Republican Institute, the International Research and Exchanges Board and the Institute for Democracy in Eastern Europe.

Awards 
He was awarded with grants 1988 of the Earhart Foundation, 1989 of the Lynde and Harry Bradley Foundation; 1991 with the leadership award of the Center for Strategic and International Studies.

In 1998 he received the Distinguished Public Service Award from the U.S. Department of State, the U.S. Agency for International Development (USAID), the U.S. Information Agency (USIA), and the Arms Control and Disarmament Agency in recognition of his contribution to international affairs.

He was awarded Medal of Gratitude by the Polish Free Trade Union Solidarity in 2010.

He is a member of the American Association for the Advancement of Slavic Studies.

Editorial work 
He is a regular contributor to various U.S. and European newspapers and journals.

Bugajski's publications include "Ethnic Politics in Eastern Europe: A Guide to Nationality, Policies, Organizations, and Parties" (M.E. Sharpe, 1994) and his book "Nations in Turmoil: Conflict and Cooperation in Eastern Europe" (Westview, 1992 and 1995), which was selected by Choice as an outstanding academic book. He also reflects the arousing tensions between Russia and the West and Russia's "neo-imperialism" at various regions of conflict as e.g. the lessons from the Russian-Georgian War in August 2008.

Selected publications 
A list of publications is published on the CSIS homepage
 Failed State: A Guide to Russia’s Rupture (Jamestown Foundation, 2022);
 Eurasian Disunion: Russia's Vulnerable Flanks (Jamestown Foundation, 2016);
 Conflict Zones: North Caucasus and Western Balkans Compared (Jamestown Foundation, 2014);
 Return of the Balkans: Challenges to European Integration and U.S. Disengagement (Strategic Studies Institute, U.S. Army War College, 2013);
 Georgian Lessons: Conflicting Russian and Western Interests in the Wider Europe (CSIS Press, 2010);
 Dismantling the West: Russia's Atlantic Agenda (Potomac Books, 2009);
 America's New European Allies (Nova, 2009);
 Expanding Eurasia: Russia's European Ambitions (CSIS, 2008);
 Atlantic Bridges: America's New European Allies, with Ilona Teleki (Rowman & Littlefield, 2007);
 Cold Peace: Russia's New Imperialism (Praeger, 2004);
 Political Parties of Eastern Europe: A Guide to Politics in the Post-Communist Era (M.E. Sharpe, 2002).
 Ethnic Politics in Eastern Europe: A Guide to Nationality Policies, Organizations, and Parties (M.E. Sharpe, 1994);
 Nations in Turmoil: Conflict and Cooperation in Eastern Europe (Westview, 1993, 1995);
 Fourth World Conflicts: Communism and Rural Societies (Westview, 1991);
 Sandinista Communism and Rural Nicaragua (Praeger/CSIS, 1990);
 East European Fault Lines: Dissent, Opposition, and Social Activism (Westview Press, 1989);
 Czechoslovakia: Charter 77's Decade of Dissent (Praeger/CSIS, 1987).

References

External links 
 https://jamestown.org/about-us/senior-fellows/
 Who's Who in Polish America, Janusz Bugajski

American political scientists
International relations scholars
American people of Polish descent
Alumni of the University of Kent
Alumni of the London School of Economics
Academics from Washington, D.C.
Living people
1954 births
Earhart Foundation Fellows
British emigrants to the United States